Alec Cartio is an Iranian-Swedish-American music video, automotive commercial and film director. He is best known for his work, which modernized the Iranian Music Video industry.

Career

Beginnings
Alec Cartio was born in Tehran, Iran to Iranian parents on 14 September 1976. He immigrated to Sweden, where he started his career as a member of the Malmö-based Swedish boy band Get Wet later renamed Caymen. The band was signed to Sony BMG and was active in the 1990s. They released a number of singles, had moderate success and toured in Scandinavian countries.

Directing music videos
Later on, he developed his career as a music video director, shooting videos for a number of artists, including FloRida, Wu Tang Clan, Brian Mcknight, Quiet Drive, Shadmehr Aghili, 786,  Black Cats, Ebi, Googoosh, Kamran & Hooman, Jamshid, Native Deen, Pyruz, Saeed Mohammadi, Sepideh, Shadmehr Aghili, Shahram Solati, Shahrum K, Valy, David Wharnsby, Zain Bhikha, Shahab Tiam, Pouya, Moein, Isadora, Budweiser, Rock by Sweden and many many more.

Notable directed videos include "Airport" for Andy & Shani, "Mi amore" and "Fix Me" for Velvet, "Temptation" for Arash & Rebecca Zadig, "Boro Boro", "Arash" and "Tike Tike" for Arash, "Henna", "Roma", "Barooneh", "Ne Na Nai", "Electric", "Bia Nazdiktar", "Sheytoonaki" for his brother Cameron Cartio, "Miss Blue" for Vincent. He also produced Cameron Cartio's album Borderless.'

Film directing
Alec Cartio has directed long feature films in addition to his directing of music videos in particular Convincing Cloony in 2011. Since 2017, he is also a classic car historian/filmmaker and BMW 8-series super specialist.

Convincing Cloony
He also directed a long film feature Convincing Clooney, a situation comedy based on Convincing Clooney and released in 2011. The film was credited to Alexander Cartio. The story line was  It was written by Cartio's longtime collaborator, actor and screenwriter Sulo Williams and produced and directed by Cartio. It was filmed in the studios of  AtlantisPic Pictures / Synkronized. It was released on November 8, 2011 on DVD. 

The cast included Sulo Williams as Jackson, Aimee Garcia as Amy, Kelly Perine as Disco, Hadley Fraser as Chris, Wilson Cruz as Joaquin, Rosanna Arquette as JC, French Stewart as HW, Assaf Cohen as Jason, Jennifer Alden as Amanda, Alexis Carra as Kristen, Chane't Johnson as Sherona, Dale Raoul as Sophia and Robin Riker as Head Honcho. Additional roles are by Neely Gurman as Paramount Casting Director, Amy Chaffee as Commercial Casting Director, Lawrence B. Adisa as Lawrence, Josh Roman as Marcus, Darren Capozzi as Frankie, Julie Johnson as Ashley, Sarah Lieving as Christine. Stephon Stewart plays the role as George Clooney.

Personal life
Alec Cartio is the brother of Swedish Iranian singer Cameron Cartio.

Music production
2005: Cameron Cartio album Borderless

Filmography
2011: Convincing Clooney

References

External links

 
Convincing Clooney trailer

Swedish record producers
Swedish music video directors
Swedish film directors
Swedish people of Iranian descent
1976 births
Living people